The 2023 season is Sri Pahang's 20th season in the Malaysia Super League since its inception in 2004. The club will also participate in the Malaysia FA Cup and Malaysia Cup.

On 17 January 2023, Fandi Ahmad has been appointed as club's new head coach.

Coaching staff

Players

First-team squad

Competitions

Malaysia Super League

Malaysia FA Cup

Player statistics

Appearances and goals

|-
|colspan="5"|Players who left the club during the 2023 season
|-
|}

Transfers

Players in

Players out

Loans in

Loans out

References

Sri Pahang FC
Sri Pahang FC seasons
2023 in Malaysian football
Sri Pahang